Ishq Positive is a 2016 Pakistani romantic comedy film directed by Noor Bukhari, written by Suraj Baba and produced by Shazia Hussain Kashif Latif under the production banner of KSL Productions. The film stars Noor Bukhari, Wali Hamid Ali Khan, Saud, Saim Ali, Ahmed Ali, Faria Bukhari, Durdana Butt. The film was scheduled for release on Eid al-Adha 2015 but was delayed and then released on 22 July 2016. At the 4th Hum Awards CEO of Hum Network Limited Duraid Qureshi announced that the film would be released under the Hum Films Banner.

Plot
The story revolves around Rajjo (Noor Bukhari) who runs away from her wedding because she did not want to marry Chaudhry Bashir (Saud). Then she met Wali (Wali Hamid Ali Khan) who was engaged to Saud's sister. Wali convinced Rajjo to go back to Saud so that he can marry his sister. Then they both came back and the wedding preparations started. After sometime, they realized that they love each other.

Cast
 Noor Bukhari as Rajjo
 Wali Hamid Ali Khan
 Saud
 Saim Ali
 Ahmed Ali
 Durdana Butt
 Sheeba Butt
 Kamran Mujahid
 Hina Rizvi as Neelo
 Iftikhar Thakur
 Marium Chaudary
 Maria Ilyas
 Sonu Sood
 Sana Fakhar

Production

Marketing
The first look of the film was revealed in June 2015. Initially the film was directed by Sangeeta and was scheduled for release on Eid al-Adha 2015 but it was delayed after Sangeeta left the project.

Soundtrack
The soundtrack of the film has been composed by Kamran Akhtar, Wali Hamid ALi Khan and Saji Ali and the lyrics have been given bylyricist A. M. Turaz from India. The music was launched in December 2015 at an event in Royal Palm Golf and Country Club, Lahore .

List of tracks

Box Office Collection 
The Pakistani movie 'Ishq Positive' managed to collect over PKR 3 to 40 million in two Weeks. Movie cost is 20 million.

See also
 List of Pakistani films of 2016

References

External links

2016 films
Pakistani romantic comedy films
2016 romantic comedy films
2016 directorial debut films
2010s Urdu-language films